Beginning with Red's Dream and its references to previous Pixar short films, Pixar has included references in its films to other works produced by the studio. These have included cameo appearances, references to characters, objects, and titles of works. Additionally, such easter eggs or in-jokes can refer to Pixar staff, associates, or places or events from the company's past. Lastly, some things, such as A113, Pizza Planet, or actor John Ratzenberger have appeared in the majority of Pixar films, establishing a set of traditions that subsequent Pixar films try to include.

The following is a list of all documented self-referential nods contained within Pixar films and shorts that the various filmmakers have incorporated into their movies.

Traditions

A113

A113 is an Easter egg that has been inserted into several animated television shows and feature films as a homage to a classroom at CalArts, the alma mater of Pixar/Disney executive John Lasseter and director Brad Bird, among others. Bird was the first to use the A113 Easter egg, on a car license plate in an animated segment entitled Family Dog in a 1987 episode of the television series Amazing Stories.
 Toy Story trilogy – License plate number on Andy's mom's minivan, later replaced by a CUV in Toy Story 3.
 A Bug's Life – Code on cereal box as Flik enters the bug city.
 Finding Nemo – Model code on camera used by scuba diver.
 The Incredibles – Room number in Syndrome's lair (not seen, only mentioned by Mirage). Also, the prison level where Mr. Incredible is held is "Level A1" in Cell #13: A1 & 13
 Cars – The number of the freight train that almost crashes into Lightning McQueen while he is first on his way to Radiator Springs. It is also Mater's license plate in both the film and the related short film, Mater and the Ghostlight.
 Ratatouille – Git, the lab rat, has a tag on his left ear that reads "A113". Also, when Linguini falls asleep to the old movie, A113 is seen on the screen.
 WALL-E – A113 is the code for the directive given to the Axioms autopilot to never return to Earth. This to date has been the largest involvement of the "A113" easter egg in the plot of a Pixar film.
 Up – A113 is the number of the court room.
 Cars 2 – A113 is the number on Siddeley's tail. It remains the number on Mater's license plate, and it is part of the image number on the spy photo of Miles Axelrod's engine.
 Inside Out – When Riley is walking up a street in San Francisco going towards the bus, she stops to see who is calling her. In the background, "A113" is written in graffiti on a building. When Riley Anderson heads to her new school in San Francisco, she is put in room A113.
 Toy Story 4 – a vintage 1970s-style A113 sign appears in the antique store.

John Ratzenberger
Described as "Pixar's good luck charm" by John Lasseter, actor John Ratzenberger has played a role in every Pixar feature from Toy Story to Onward, including a few not produced by Pixar. Soul is the first film where John Ratzenberger uses his likeness instead of a voice role, while he is not present at all in Luca, Turning Red or Lightyear.
 Toy Story, Toy Story 2, Toy Story 3  and Toy Story 4 – Hamm
 A Bug's Life – P.T. Flea
 Monsters, Inc., Monsters University and Monsters at Work – Adorable, the Abominable Snowman
 Finding Nemo – School of fish
 The Incredibles and Incredibles 2 – The Underminer
 Cars, Cars 2, Cars 3 – Mack
 At the end of Cars, there is a drive-in theater that shows John Ratzenberger as some of the parts of the movies, which are car-versions of Toy (Car) Story, A Bug's Life, and Monster (Trucks), Inc. Mack even notes that they keep using the same actor again.
 Ratatouille – Mustafa the waiter
 WALL-E – John
 Up – Tom the foreman
 Brave – Gordon the guard
 Inside Out – Fritz
 The Good Dinosaur – Earl the velociraptor
 Finding Dory – Bill the crab
 Coco – Juan Ortodoncia, a skeleton in the Land of the Dead with bad teeth
 Onward – Fenwick the construction worker
 Soul – Although not a voice role, a computer animated version of the actor can be seen 1-hour-and-8-minutes into the film when Joe Gardner (Mr. Mittens) chases 22 (Joe) into the Subway station. He's wearing a white dress shirt and a red tie.

Luxo Ball
A yellow ball with a blue stripe and a red star, which was first shown in the short Luxo, Jr., has been shown in the Pixar logo sequence and several Pixar feature films and shorts, most prominently in the Toy Story franchise.
 When Buzz Lightyear demonstrates how he "flies" in Toy Story, he bounces off a Luxo Ball.
 In Toy Story 2, one Luxo Ball appears in a TV commercial for Al's Toy Barn.
 Several Luxo Balls can be seen when the toys enter Al's Toy Barn in Toy Story 2: when entering the store, one can be easily seen to the left; when leaving, a whole container of Luxo Balls can be seen to the left.
 A Luxo Ball appears in a trailer for Toy Story and Toy Story 2 double feature in Disney Digital 3-D.
 In Boo's room in Monsters, Inc.; When Boo returns to her room, she gives Sulley the ball.
 In the Incredibles short film Jack-Jack Attack as one of the toys given to Jack-Jack by Kari.
 On the floor of a neighbor child's room and on one of Russell's merit badges in Up.
 The ball's design pattern appeared on the floor of the circus ring in Red's Dream.
 In Inside Out, the ball briefly appears during a flashback of young Riley playing hide and seek with Bing Bong.
 In Toy Story 4, when Buzz is stuck at the wall of prizes, plastic rockets that have the star logo from the Luxo Ball on them can be seen hanging next to him. The ball itself also appears in the antique shop.
 In Turning Red, the ball is seen in the swimming pool at Tyler's party.

Pizza Planet
Pizza Planet is a fictional pizza restaurant that appears in Toy Story.  In the film, it is a large, sci-fi-themed restaurant with arcade games including robot guards at the entrance. The company runs a fleet of derelict Toyota Hilux pickup trucks (as evidenced by the inscription on the tailgate; it is a Toyota inscription with the first and last two letters, "TO" and "TA",  worn off so it simply appears as "YO") with a rocket on the roof featuring the restaurant's logo, as seen in Toy Story, Toy Story 2 and Toy Story 3 (though in Toy Story 2, the truck model is called a "Gyoza" as seen on the owner's manual).  There is a Pizza Planet reference in every Pixar feature film to date except for the film The Incredibles. Lee Unkrich has confirmed that there is no Pizza Planet truck anywhere in The Incredibles.
 In Toy Story, Woody sees the truck at the gas station and tells Buzz it is a spaceship with hyper-active hyperdrive which they head on it to the restaurant itself.
 In A Bug's Life, the truck appears in the scene where one insect warns another not to touch a motor home's bug zapper. A Pizza Planet cup also appears in the Bug City.
 In Monsters, Inc., when a redneck mother is beating Randall with a shovel, the truck is on the far left side of the screen. This is the same motor home that appeared in A Bug's Life.
 In Finding Nemo, while Gill is explaining his plan to escape from the dentist office, a yellow Pizza Planet truck drives by.
 In Cars, there is an anthropomorphic Pizza Planet truck named Todd at the stadium for the final race. There also exists a diecast car of it.
 In Ratatouille, the Pizza Planet truck is briefly seen crossing the bridge over the Seine when Skinner is chasing Remy.
 In WALL-E, EVE scans the engine of a Pizza Planet truck for plant life shortly after her arrival on Earth, and shuts the hood afterwards.
 In Up, the Pizza Planet truck is seen on the street as Carl's house floats by, although the truck has more of a delivery van appearance than the actual truck in other films. An actual Pizza Planet truck can be seen in a parking lot when Carl has a fantasy of leaving Russell. At the end, when Carl takes Russell and Dug for ice cream, the real Pizza Planet truck can be seen parked.
 In Toy Story 3, the Pizza Planet truck is the vehicle that Lots-o-Huggin' Bear, Big Baby, and Chuckles rides on to get around Sunnyside Daycare. Pizza Planet is also seen as a calendar sponsor.
 In Cars 2, Todd the Pizza Planet truck is attending to the Radiator Springs Grand Prix. He also appears in the background of a triptych poster of the movie, in front of Buckingham Palace.
 In Brave the Pizza Planet Truck appears as a wood carving in the witches cottage. John Lasseter commented in an interview that although the story of Brave takes place in the past, they found a way to put the Pizza Planet Truck in the story.
 In The Good Dinosaur, an asteroid in the shape of the Pizza Planet truck can be seen in the asteroid belt. Director Peter Sohn has indicated that the truck makes a second appearance in the film, which has not yet been identified.
 In Cars 3, Todd the Pizza Planet truck can be briefly seen participating in the Crazy 8 demolition derby.
 In Onward, the Pizza Planet truck is seen near a toll booth, among a few other appearances. In fitting with the fantasy theme, the rocket now reads "Pizza Realm".
 In Luca, the Pizza Planet truck has been modified to be a delivery scooter, along with the other scooters that reside in Portorosso.
 In Turning Red, the Pizza Planet Truck is seen on the street as Mei heads towards the 4*TOWN concert.
 In Lightyear, a truck resembling Pizza Planet's can be seen as Buzz and Sox leave to attempt a new hyperspace test.

Companies
To avoid overt product placement in Pixar films, a series of fictional companies are used as placeholders. Some appear only in one franchise (such as fictional NASCAR sponsors in Cars) but others serve as recurring themes.

Buy-n-Large (BnL)
Buy-n-Large is a fictional mega-corporation that first appeared in WALL-E as the entity which controlled all economic and government services on the future Earth.
 WALL-E
 Buy-n-Large logos are seen throughout the movie and the company president appears in a message to the captain of the Axiom.
 Toy Story 3
 Buzz Lightyear's batteries are "BnL Alkaline".
 Cars 3
 One of the race tracks on which Jackson Storm is shown having a winning streak is called "BnL Raceway".
 Soul
 The Buy-n-Large logo is featured in one of the stickers.

Dinoco

Dinoco is a fictional oil company that first appeared in Toy Story as a small gas station. It plays a central role as a key race car sponsor in Cars, and made a small cameo in WALL-E. The company's logo is a dinosaur, but with a Brontosaurus in Toy Story and a Tyrannosaurus in Cars (a reference to Sinclair Oil, which uses a similar dinosaur logo. The name, however, is similar to Sunoco, the current oil and gasoline sponsor of NASCAR).
 Toy Story
 Andy's Mom goes to the gas station to fuel and it's where Woody and Buzz fight and were left behind.
 Cars
 The company's branding uses a pale blue shade referred to as "Dinoco blue", originally created for Richard Petty's racecar. "The King" is portrayed with Dinoco branding as #43, a Plymouth Superbird. Dinoco is the most lucrative sponsor in the Piston Cup, a parody of NASCAR's Grand National driver's trophy series, which was originally called Winston Cup lending its name to the "Dinoco 400" race at the "Motor Speedway of the South", an enlarged Bristol Speedway. Its owner Tex is a loyal, longtime sponsor of The King #43, a veteran racer on the verge of retirement. This corporate sponsorship is the primary trophy for which the race cars in Cars contend. The Dinoco brand features prominently in much Cars-related merchandise.
 WALL-E
 The Dinoco name and logo appear on a lighter.

Eggman Movers 
Eggman Movers is a fictional moving company that has an anthropomorphic egg with a hat as a mascot and appears mostly throughout the Toy Story franchise. The company's name is a reference to Pixar production designer Ralph Eggleston.
 Toy Story 4
 An old advertising sign for Eggman Moving appears at the antique store.

Poultry Palace
Poultry Palace is a fictional chicken-based fast-food chain that first appears in the Toy Story short Small Fry.
 Toy Story 4
 During their road trip, Bonnie and her parents can briefly be seen eating at a Poultry Palace location.
At the antiques store, an old Poultry Palace sign can be seen.
Onward
 A Poultry Palace cup can be seen on the gas station's counter.
 Lightyear
 Poultry Palace-branded cookies can be seen in the vending machine at the mining facility.

Movies

Toy Story franchise
These Pixar films contain the following references to the Toy Story films, shorts, and television specials:

 A Bug's Life
 In one of the bloopers that play during the end credits, Flik, as he is about to take flight, quotes Buzz Lightyear's catchphrase "To Infinity and Beyond", instead of "For the colony, and for oppressed ants everywhere!".
 One of the additional bloopers features Woody as a crewman, running the clapperboard, appearing after Dr. Flora accidentally pronounced Atta as "Princess Abba", and she, with Mr. Soil, jokes of it after.
 Monsters, Inc.
 Andy's cloud wallpaper is shown while Randall is practicing his scares.
 When Boo returns home at the end, a Jessie doll is seen on her table. She then hands Sulley the doll.
 During a blooper, while Mike and Sulley are walking to work, they wait at a crosswalk next to Ted's leg, who roars and stomps his feet. The camera zooms out to reveal that the leg belongs to Rex, who then asks anxiously how it went, if he can do it again and promises to be taller. In the actual film, Ted makes chicken sounds. 
 A larger version of a clown toy from Andy's Room appears at the laugh floor at the end near the laugh canisters.
 The toy airplane that Buzz lands on when first attempting to fly is seen on a shelf at the beginning of the film.
 Finding Nemo
 When Nemo is frantically looking for a way to escape the fish tank in the dentist's office, a Buzz Lightyear action figure can be seen lying next to the toy box in the waiting room.
 Cars
 The tires of all the Piston Cup racers (including Lightning McQueen) are Lightyear Buzzard tires, a reference to Buzz Lightyear and Goodyear Eagle tires.
 WALL-E
 Rex is seen in Wall-E's house.
 Hamm can be seen in Wall-E's house when EVE visits.
 The orange traffic cones from Toy Story 2 can be seen in garbage piles and Wall-E's room.
 Up
 The grape soda brand for the bottle cap that Ellie gives to Carl is the same as seen in the Buzz Lightyear commercial in Toy Story.
 Lots-O'-Huggin' Bear can be seen as the balloons pass a child's room.

A Bug's Life
These Pixar films and shorts contain the following references to A Bug's Life:

 Toy Story 2
 The calendar in Andy's room shows a still image of ants carrying food and walking across a blade of grass.
 When Mrs. Potato Head is waiting for her earring, she's reading a storybook retelling the events of A Bug's Life.
 Heimlich can be seen as a small caterpillar, crawling on a branch just before Buzz cuts through. In the bloopers reel seen in some cuts of the film, this is expanded upon in a small scene where Heimlich and Flik discuss a potential sequel to A Bug's Life on the branch before getting knocked off by Buzz.
 Some of the characters are seen as toys after the "NEW" banner at Al's Toy Barn is seen.
 The tree on top of the hill during the "When She Loved Me" sequence is the same tree that tops Ant Island.
 Monsters, Inc.
 The place Randall gets banished to is the old trailer with the deadly bug light and the Pizza Planet truck.
 Cars
 The drive-in movie shows A Bug's Life, featuring stylized car versions of characters Flik, the circus bugs and P.T. Flea.
 Your Friend the Rat
 P.T. Flea appears when the rats are talking about fleas causing the Black Death.
 Toy Story 3
 When Woody climbs into the ceiling at Sunnyside, letters spelling ATTA, the name of the Princess are seen.
 A toy version of Flik can be seen jumping away as the line of children are about to come back in from recess.
 Toy Story 4
 At the Second Chance Antiques store, the Casey Jr. cookie box as well as a "P.J.'s Pop" sign can be seen as store items.

Monsters, Inc. franchise
These Pixar films contain the following references to Monsters, Inc. or Monsters University:

 Finding Nemo
 The fish mobile found in the dentist's office is the same one featured in Boo's room.
 Mike can be seen swimming in scuba gear during the credits.
 Boo's teddy bear can be spotted in the toy chest at the dentist's office.
 Cars
 The drive-in movie shows Monster Trucks, Inc., featuring stylized car versions of characters Sulley, Mike, and the Abominable Snowman (here known as the Abominable Snowplow).
 WALL-E
 One of the many garbage cubes in the movie is the garbage cube Sulley had thought Boo was in. Also, a Mike Wazowski antenna ball is seen.
 Toy Story 3
 A girl in the Butterfly Room at Sunnyside looks like a slightly older Boo.
 Toy versions of Boo and Mike Wazowski are seen in Sunnyside Daycare.

Finding Nemo franchise
These Pixar films and shorts contain the following references to Finding Nemo and Finding Dory:

 Monsters, Inc.
 Before Mike says "And he is....outta here!" as they're throwing Randall through the door, Nemo can be seen hanging on the wall.
 Boo gives Sulley a Nemo toy before he leaves her room. (As Monsters, Inc. was made before Finding Nemo this was a sneak peek)
 On the wall behind the sushi chef at Harryhausen's, there is a clownfish.
 Boundin'
 The arm that grabs the lamb belongs to the dentist.<ref name="boundincomm">Boundin commentary by Bud Luckey.</ref>
 The fish are based on Gurgle.
 WALL-E In the end credits, Crush appears as a mosaic.
 Toy Story 3 Mr. Ray is on a shelf at the daycare.
 One of the dolphins is on a shelf at the daycare.
 A Nemo sticker is seen on Andy's toy dresser.
 Images of Nemo and Dory are seen on the wall at Sunnyside Daycare when Buzz escapes the Caterpillar room.

The Incredibles franchise
These Pixar films contain the following references to The Incredibles and Incredibles 2:

 Finding Nemo A young boy in the dentist's office is reading a Mr. Incredible comic book.
 Ratatouille Bomb Voyage appears as a mime.
 WALL-E A Frozone bobblehead is seen in WALL-E's truck. In some BnL advertisements, including those in the special edition DVD, there is a family who resembles the Parr family.
 Cars 2 The marquee at the Radiator Springs Drive-In Theater reads "The Incredimobiles".

Cars franchise
These films and shorts contain references to Cars, Cars 2 or Cars 3:

 Finding Nemo A yellow Fiat 500 similar to Luigi can be seen driving across the street.Boundin' Stanley makes a cameo appearance.
 The Incredibles When the Incredibles and Frozone fight against the Omnidroid, a non-anthropomorphic Doc Hudson can be seen parked in the background. It actually survived being crushed or broken from the fight.
 WALL-E A Lightning McQueen toy is seen.
 A Leak Less bottle is seen.
 Toy Story 3 In the Western action sequence at the beginning of the film, the runaway train has the engine number 95, a reference to Lightning McQueen and the year the original Toy Story came out.
 A Lightning McQueen-styled wooden car appears in the Daycare.
 "ReVolting" batteries are seen on a table where some of the toys are playing cards. (ReVolting was the sponsor for Car #84.)
 When Buzz shakes hands with Sparks, a tractor toy similar to the "cows" rolls past them.
 The calendar in Andy's room which used to show an image from A Bug's Life now has a picture of a non-anthropomorphic Snot Rod from Cars. Both calendars, years apart, are turned to the month of August.
 Finn McMissile is seen on a poster in Andy's room.
 A firetruck that resembles Red is seen at Sunnyside Daycare.
 A child at Sunnyside Daycare wears a shirt with a 95 emblazoned with a lightning bolt, a reference to Lightning McQueen.

Ratatouille
These films contain references to the film Ratatouille:

 WALL-E Skinner's scooter can be seen in the junkyard.
 Cars 2 In Paris, a car version of Gusteau's Restaurant is seen as "Gastow's" in the background.

WALL-E
These films contain references to the film WALL-E:

 Your Friend the Rat WALL-E can be seen driving a bus-like ship on a future human-colonized Mars.

Up
These films contain references to the film Up:

 Ratatouille As Remy runs through Paris, a shadow of Dug is cast against a wall.
 Toy Story 3 One of the papers (which is a postcard) on top of Andy's dresser says "Carl and Ellie Fredricksen" on it.
 Toy Story 4 At the Second Chance Antiques store, a painting of Charles Muntz and his four dogs playing poker can be seen.
 Bo Peep's sheep pick up a cap of Grape Soda.

Brave
These films or shorts contain references to the film Brave:

 Cars 2 During the London chase scene, the Lemons crash into a pub. On the wall is a tapestry depicting Princess  and her family as cars.

 Inside Out 
These films contain references to the film Inside Out:

 Cars 3 Two racecars are sponsored by the TripleDent brand, which in-universe is sold as a "spearmint-flavored dent filler".
 Incredibles 2 A 60's styled TripleDent logo can be spotted as:
 Helen gives chase to the Metrolev Train.
 The Parrs go after a group of robbers in the film's final scene.
 Toy Story 4 At the antique store, an old advertising sign for TripleDent bubblegum can be seen.
 Bing Bong's wagon also appears in the antique store.
 Onward In the gas station, TripleDent bubblegum can be seen in the counter.
 Turning Red At the Daisy Mart, TripleDent bubblegum can be seen in some display racks.

 Coco 
These films contain references to the film Coco:

 Cars 3 Cruz uses an image of the Santa Cecilia Grave to motivate a homesick trainee.
 The Shiny Guitar is hung on the wall behind the band playing at the Cotter Pin Bar in Thomasville.
 Toy Story 4 A toy version of Héctor's guitar is among the wall of prizes.
 On a record player at the Second Chance Antiques store, a Greatest Hits record of Ernesto de la Cruz can be seen.

Shorts

The Adventures of André and Wally B.
These films contain references to The Adventures of André and Wally B.:

 Red's Dream André is on a clock.
 Toy Story A book with the same title as the short is visible on Andy's bookshelf.
 WALL-E Wally B. is seen.
 Toy Story 3 Wally B. is seen on Bonnie's backpack.Toy Story 4 A handkerchief with the name Wally B. written on it appears in the antique store.
 Soul André's head appears in one of the stickers which appear several times throughout the film.

Luxo, Jr.
These films contain references to Luxo, Jr.:

 Toy Story On Andy's desk is the older lamp, although painted red instead of gray. It's also seen in Toy Story 2
 Toy Story 2 Scenes from the short film can be seen on Andy's TV when Hamm is quickly flipping through the channels.
 WALL-E When WALL-E builds a statue of EVE from garbage, one of her arms is the older lamp.

Red's Dream
These films contain references to Red's Dream:

 Toy Story The title of this short film is seen on a book.
 WALL-E The unicycle is visible at the left of the screen as WALL-E falls from the ceiling.

Tin Toy
These films contain references to Tin Toy:

 Toy Story A book named after the short is on Andy's bookshelf: the author is Lasseter.
 Toy Story 2 Billy can be seen several times briefly on one of the channels on Andy's TV when Hamm is quickly flipping through the channels.
 Toy Story 3 The same toys are cowering beneath a counter as Rex approaches the door.

Knick Knack
These films contain references to Knick Knack:

 Toy Story Knick Knack is the title of a book on Andy's bookshelf.
 Toy Story 2 Scenes from the short film can be seen on Andy's TV when Hamm is quickly flipping through the channels.
 Up During Married Life, when Carl is at the Travel Agency, the brochure on the desk features a picture of "Sunny Miami," which includes the girl in the bikini from this short.

For the Birds
The following Pixar films reference For the Birds:

 Cars The birds are seen sitting on a powerline during the musical segment as Mack and Lightning drive across the country. They chirp as the camera pans by them.

Geri's Game
These Pixar films contain the following references to Geri's Game:

 Toy Story 2 Al hires a man resembling Geri to restore Woody (credited as 'The Cleaner'). As a further reference to the character, chess pieces are seen in the middle drawer of his toolbox.

===Boundin===
These Pixar films contain the following references to Boundin':

 Cars
 During the opening race, just before a fan trailer whistles, a picture of the Jackalope is seen at the back of a van.

Apple
These Pixar films contain the following references to Apple Inc.

 Cars
 A racecar in Apple livery (coincidentally sporting number 84 in reference to the original Macintosh's release date) is present during the opening race. This reference would eventually return in a similar way for Cars 3.
 WALL-E
 WALL-E uses an iPod to watch Hello, Dolly!.
 EVE was designed in consultation with Jonathan Ive, at the time a major industrial designer for Apple, who was instrumental in the designs of the iMac, iPhone and iPod, among other devices.
 Brave
 The end credits feature a dedication to Steve Jobs, the founder of Apple and chief executive of Pixar, who died in 2011.
 Coco
 The first Apple Macintosh computer can be seen in an office from the Bureau of Family Grievances.

Cast and crew

Cameos
These Pixar films contain cameo appearances by Pixar employees.

References
These Pixar films contain references to Pixar employees.

 Toy Story
 Eggman Moving, the name of the moving company, is a reference to Pixar production designer Ralph Eggleston, who is known as "Eggman".
 "P.J.'s Pop", the name of a fictional soda brand that appears on a bottle cap, is a reference to John Lasseter's son Paul James Lasseter.
 Finding Nemo
 Brad Bird's son Nicholas provided the voice of Squirt.
 Ratatouille
 Colette rides a Calahan motorcycle, a reference to director of photography Sharon Calahan.
 Toy Story 3
 Pins on the map in Andy's room correspond to the hometowns of the production staff.
 Toy Story 4
 In the antique store appears a Papa Rivera’s Pure Pork Lard sign, which is a nod to Toy Story 4 producer Jonas Rivera, as well as a sign for Catmull’s Cream Soda, which is a homage to Pixar co-founder Edwin Catmull.

Other
These Pixar films contain the following references to an assortment of other things.

Films
 Toy Story 3
 Totoro, from Hayao Miyazaki's 1988 film My Neighbor Totoro makes an appearance in Bonnie's room.
 The number in Trixie's screen name (Velocistar237) is a reference to The Shining. The number 237 also appears on the license plate of the garbage truck.
 The scene where Woody gets sucked into the cellar is a reference to a similar scene in The Evil Dead.
 Toy Story 4
 One of Buzz Lightyear's recorded sayings is "Open the pod bay doors!", a reference to Stanley Kubrick’s 2001: A Space Odyssey, where the same line can be heard.
 At the end of the film, when Duke Caboom jumps in front of a bright full moon, this is a homage to a famous similar shot in E.T.: The Extra-Terrestrial.

TV shows
 Toy Story 3
 The lunchbox Buzz grabs in the landfill is of The Six Million Dollar Man.

Miscellaneous
 Toy Story 2
 The design of Al's car is based on the Ford Mystere concept car from 1955.
 Toy Story 3
 Above Andy’s closet is a street sign for W. Cutting Blvd., the street where Pixar’s original headquarters were located.
 A pennant on one of Andy's walls reads “P.U.”, for Pixar University, a development program for Pixar employees.
 An application on Andy's bulletin board is for a college in Emeryville, the location of the Pixar Studios.
 Toy Story 4
 The address of the antique store is a street number 1200, a reference to the studio's address (1200 Park Avenue, Emeryville, California).
 Some of the attractions at the fun fair are replicas of the Toy Story Mania attractions at Disneyland and Walt Disney World.
When Woody pretends to be a phone in the antiques store, his pose - holding the receiver of an old touchtone phone - resembles the classic Mickey Mouse phone that was ubiquitous in many homes in the 1970s and 1980s.
Duke Caboom is strongly inspired by real-life motorcycle stuntman Evel Knievel. His motorcycle is a reference to a toy motorcycle based on Evel Knievel, which, according to the commercials promoting it, was able to do some amazing stunts which it actually couldn't, very similar to Caboom and his motorcycle in the film.
Onward
One of the candy bars in the gas station's counter is called "Park Avenue", a reference to the studio's address (1200 Park Avenue, Emeryville, California).

See also
 List of fictional universes in animation and comics
 List of filmmaker's signatures

References

Notes

References
Film references